The Rocky Mountain Association of Geologists (RMAG), based in Denver, Colorado,  is one of the oldest and largest regional geological societies in the United States.  The society is a nonprofit organization founded in 1922.  It is a regional affiliate of the American Association of Petroleum Geologists (AAPG).

RMAG publishes geological research, sponsors monthly lectures, and geological field trips.  The society organizes and sponsors numerous educational conferences and continuing education courses, often in association with other geological societies.

Publications
 The Mountain Geologist, a quarterly peer-reviewed journal of geological research.
 The Outcrop, a monthly newsletter.
 various conference proceedings.

References

External links
Rocky Mountain Association of Geologists website

Geology societies
1922 establishments in the United States
Scientific societies based in the United States
Organizations based in Denver
Rocky Mountains